Josif Papamihali (23 September 1912 – 26 October 1948), was an Albanian catholic priest of the Byzantine Rite.

Life 
Born in Elbasan on September 23, 1912, he studied Philosophy and Theology in the "Collegio Greco" in Rome, near the Angelicum where he was ordained a priest on December 1, 1935 from by the Italo-Albanian bishop of the Eparchy of Lungro and the bishop of Greek-Byzantine rite who orders the Albanians of Sicily.

Papamihali returned to Albania in 1936 and served as a parishioner in Elbasan, Korçë, Berat, Lushnje and Pogradec. From 1944 he was in charge of the Mission of the Greco-Catholic Church of Albania.

He was arrested by the communist authorities in Korçë on October 31, 1946 and was later convicted as an enemy of the state. On August 5, 1947 Papamihali was sentenced by the courts to 5 years imprisonment and forced labor and was transferred to Korçë and later Maliq where he died. He was found buried alive in a marsh where he had fallen from exhaustion on October 26, 1948.

He was beatified in Shkodër along with thirty-seven other fellow Albanian martyrs on November 5, 2016.

References

People from Elbasan
Albanian Roman Catholics
1912 births
1948 deaths
People from Manastir vilayet